Victor Harbor may refer to:

Places in South Australia
Victor Harbor, South Australia, a locality
Victor Harbor High School
City of Victor Harbor, a local government area

Transport
Victor Harbor Horse Drawn Tram
Victor Harbor Road
Victor Harbor railway line

Other
Victor Harbor Football Club, an Australian rules football club in South Australia
Victor Harbor Times, a newspaper in South Australia
Port Victor (disambiguation)